Sergei Chernyshev (b. 27 June 2000, Voronezh, Russia), a.k.a. Bumblebee, is a Russian competitive breakdancer. Chernyshev, competing under the nickname 'Bumblebee', won the individual B-Boys gold medal at the 2018 Summer Youth Olympics, where breakdancing made its debut as a part of the Youth Olympics.

Life and career
Sergei Chernyshev's father, also named Sergei Chernyshev, was one of the first organizers of breakdancing in Voronezh in 1990s. 
From the age of four the younger Chernyshev was doing gymnastics. In 2009 his parents opened a dance studio "Infinity" in Voronezh, and Chernyshev switched to breakdancing that year, at the age of nine. Chernyshev continues to train there, with his father as coach.

Sergei Chernyshev participated in two seasons of the  dancing competition show "Tantsy" on  the Russian television channel TNT.

Chernyshev competes in breakdancing competitions under the moniker 'Bumblebee', named after Bumblebee, a robot superhero in the Transformers franchise.

Chernyshev qualified for participation in the 2018 Summer Youth Olympics by taking the 2-nd place at the 2018 World Youth Breaking Championship in Kawasaki, Japan.

At the 2018 Summer Youth Olympics in Buenos Aires, dancesport made its first appearance as a part of the games' competition program, with medals being contested in breakdancing. Sergei Chernyshev, competing as Bumblebee, won the individual gold medal in the B-Boys competition. Bumblebee also won the bronze medal in the Mixed Team breakdancing, competing together with an Austrian B-Girl Ella. Chernyshev was the flag bearer for the Russian national team at the closing ceremony of the 2018 Summer Youth Olympics.

Chernyshev is a student of the construction faculty of Voronezh State Technical University (VGTU).

Chernyshev plans to continue competing in breakdancing at least until the 2024 Summer Olympics in Paris, where breakdancing will for the first time feature as a part of the competition program.

References

External links
Bumblebee on Instagram
Sergei Chernyshev a.k.a. Bumblebee, profile at www.and8.dance

2000 births
Dancesport
21st-century Russian dancers
Sportspeople from Voronezh
Russian male athletes
Living people
Breakdancers at the 2018 Summer Youth Olympics
Medalists at the 2018 Summer Youth Olympics
Youth Olympic gold medalists for Russia